Duncan is an unincorporated community in Georgetown Township, Floyd County, Indiana.

History
A post office was established at Duncan in 1899, and remained in operation until it was discontinued in 1915.

Geography

References

Unincorporated communities in Floyd County, Indiana
Unincorporated communities in Indiana
Louisville metropolitan area